Keep It in the Family is a 1971 British television comedy produced by Yorkshire Television which ran for six episodes. Cast included Tim Barrett, Vivienne Martin, Joyce Grant, Jack Haig, and Tony Maiden. Although wiping was common among British broadcasters of the early 1970s, the series exists in its entirety.

References

External links
 

1970s British comedy television series
1971 British television series debuts
1971 British television series endings
English-language television shows
ITV sitcoms